Alejandro Daniel Islas Arroyo (born 24 May 1992 in Mexico State, Mexico) is a Mexican diver. He competed in the individual 3 metre trampoline event at the 2012 Summer Olympics.

References
 dive meets

Mexican male divers
1992 births
Living people
Divers at the 2012 Summer Olympics
Olympic divers of Mexico
Sportspeople from the State of Mexico
Universiade medalists in diving
Universiade bronze medalists for Mexico
Medalists at the 2015 Summer Universiade